The 55th District of the Iowa House of Representatives in the state of Iowa.

Current elected officials
Michael Bergan is the representative currently representing the district.

Past representatives
The district has previously been represented by:
 John N. Nystrom, 1971–1973
 William R. Ferguson, 1973–1975
 Carroll Perkins, 1975–1981
 Karen Mann, 1981–1983
 Virgil E. Corey, 1983–1989
 Mark S. Shearer, 1989–1993
 Chuck Larson, 1993–2003
 Clarence Hoffman, 2003–2009
 Jason Schultz, 2008–2013
 Roger Thomas, 2013–2015
 Darrel Branhagen, 2015–2017
 Michael Bergan, 2017–present

References

055